The Australia women's national field hockey team results for the period 2010 to 2019. New fixtures are to be found on the team's section on the Hockey Australia page.

Match results

2010 Results

2011 Results

2012 Results

2013 Results

2014 Results

2015 Results

2016 Results

2017 Results

2018 Results

2019 Results

References

Australia sport-related lists